Jawaharlal Nehru Stadium (also known as the Marina Arena) is a multi-purpose stadium in Chennai, India. It has a capacity to seat 40,000 people. It hosts football matches and athletic competitions. The complex also houses a multipurpose indoor stadium with a seating capacity of 5,000 which hosts volleyball, basketball, table tennis games. The stadium is also used for functions and concerts. The stadium is named after Jawaharlal Nehru, India's first Prime Minister. The stadium earlier hosted cricket test matches between 1956 and 1965. As of 19 August 2017 it has hosted 9 tests.

The stadium is located at Sydenhams Road, Park Town behind the Chennai Central suburban railway station and the Ripon Building. Tamil Nadu football team, which plays in Santosh Trophy and Chennaiyin FC, the Indian Super League team representing the city, use the stadium as their home ground.

History
The stadium was built on the area where the old Madras Zoo was located before it was shifted to its present location in at Vandalur. Jawahrlal Nehru came to visit Tamil Nadu after Independence. He was in Opened vehicle and roaming the Stadium all people were waiting for see Our 1st prime minister of India at the zoo ground. That time the experience driver Mr Kuppuswamy alias Kutty who drove the vehicle. He was a loyalty man for congress. He is skilled and talented driver. So Mr. Kuppuswamy alias Kutty  was appointed as a driver for the first Prime minister of India Honorable Mr Jawaharlal Nehru. Mr Kuppuswamy had 2 sons and 2 daughters. One who was dead in child hood. Mr KK Ethirajulu second son of Mr Kuppuswamy travel in congress till 2023. He is living in Chennai Kotturpuram now. And Mr Kuppuswamy saved Aringar Anna, Dr Kalainjar, Mr Nedunjezian and one more person. Who were in life threat. He saved them in driving car.
It was known as the Corporation stadium until the 1980s and used to witness houseful audience for even the city league matches. When C. R. Viswanathan, then the Secretary of the Tamil Nadu Football Association, was keen on bringing the Nehru Cup international football tournament to Chennai, a stadium of international standard was required. He approached the then Chief Minister J Jayalalithaa with a plan to convert the old Corporation stadium into a brand-new ultra-modern facility. In January 1993, the competition was conducted successfully in the new facility that was acknowledged to be arguably the best in the country also doubling up as a track and field venue.

In 1993, this stadium in Chennai hosted the Nehru Cup international tournament. It has also hosted the SAF Games football in 1995, and the Jayalalitha Gold Cup international women's tournament, and many pre-Olympic and pre-world cup matches.

The Nehru stadium at Chennai is considered the most favoured venue for any international fixture since this stadium is the only football facility in the country which has come up in keeping with the FIFA specifications with regard to the players’ facility, the dressing rooms and security aspects to name a few important parameters.

Facilities
The stadium has a seating capacity of 40,000 with 36,000 being seated, a 400-meter 8-lane synthetic athletics track and a natural football turf. There is an indoor stadium with a seating capacity of 8000 associated with the stadium. Two Beach Volleyball courts, three clay Volleyball courts, one Throw ball court, one Kabaddi field and one Handball court are also available in the complex. There are also facilities for Judo, Weightlifting, Table Tennis, Boxing, Chess and Carrom besides a Fitness Center and a conference hall. The indoor stadium hosts various functions and concerts.

Events
The stadium hosted nine cricket Test matches between 1956 and 1965. In 1998, it hosted the World Volleyball Grand Prix tournament.

Records

Football
The highest goal scoring match in Indian Super League with 8 goals between Chennaiyin FC and Mumbai City FC (2-6) on 12 November 2022 in the 2022-23 Indian Super League season.

Cricket
The highest test cricket scores were made by West Indies cricket team with 600–9 and 537–9. The most runs scored here was by Vijay Manjrekar (487 runs), Chandu Borde (431 runs) and Budhi Kunderan (346 runs). The most wickets taken here was by Bapu Nadkarni (20 wickets), Salim Durani (19 wickets) and Subhash Gupte (17 wickets).

Highest opening stand of 413 runs was recorded here by MH Mankad and P Roy against New Zealand.

List of Five Wicket Hauls

Tests
A total of 12 five-wicket hauls in Test matches have been taken at the venue.

See also

List of stadiums in India
List of Test cricket grounds

References

Volleyball venues in India
Sports venues in Chennai
Football venues in Tamil Nadu
Indoor arenas in India
Football in Tamil Nadu
Multi-purpose stadiums in India
Athletics (track and field) venues in India
Monuments and memorials to Jawaharlal Nehru
Basketball venues in India
Indian Super League stadiums
Sports venues completed in 1993
1993 establishments in Tamil Nadu
20th-century architecture in India